The St Austell and Clay Country Eco-town is a plan to build a new town on a cluster of sites owned by mining company Imerys near St Austell, in Cornwall, UK. The plan was given outline government approval in July 2009. The plan would need to gain full planning permission before construction commenced.

A number of organisations are involved in the development. A joint venture company called ECO-BOS has been set up by Imerys, and Orascom, with assistance from the Eden Project. This company will prepare the planning application and build the development if granted. Cornwall Council will lead on some part of the project.

Background
The plan was provisionally termed Imerys China Clay Community, in 2008 it was shortlisted by the UK's Department for Communities and Local Government as one of the 10 eco-towns proposed for construction in the UK.

Under the company's plans, 5,000 eco-homes would be built on former china clay quarries and other sites owned by Imerys over a 20-year period.
The sites are:
Baal & West Carclaze near the villages of Penwithick and Stenalees. The plan includes 1,800-2,500 homes, a 31-acre lake and eight hectares of employment land.
Par Docks, near to  Par: a new marina with facilities for local fishing boats, 500-700 homes, and a biomass energy centre.
Blackpool, close to the villages of Trewoon, High Street and Lanjeth: 2,100 and 2,500 homes, a new railway station, new schools, a lake and eco-parkland.
Goonbarrow on the edge of the village of Bugle: 450-550 homes.
Drinnick & Nanpean on the edge of the village of Nanpean: 150-300 homes.

A pilot project consisting of 48 homes, community and employment buildings is planned for the Baal & West Carclaze site. The homes will be built with high level of energy efficiency including some with a zero-carbon rating.

The plan includes several renewable energy sources such as geo-thermal, solar, biomass generation, wind farms, water source heating/cooling and rainwater harvesting.

Matthew Taylor, former local MP, was appointed as an independent chair of a board set up to develop the project.

In December 2012, the developers of the St Austell eco-town announced that plans had been put on hold indefinitely, blaming the depressed economic situation for their decision. 

In September 2013, it was announced that Cornwall Council had accepted a grant of more than £1.5 million from Central Government to push for the revival of the project in the West Carclaze area along the A391 from the Carclaze to the edges of Stenalees and Penwithick. The revised plans, include 1,500 homes, a primary school, a technology park, solar farms and recreational facilities.  A community consultation was held in May and June 2014, this resulted in several changes to the master plan. A planning application which is due to be submitted in December 2014.

The project was included in a list of fourteen garden villages announced by the Government in January 2017.

Reception
The plan has received some local opposition. The "No Ecotown" group has fears that few of the homes will be affordable as well as increased traffic congestion, lack of employment opportunities, swamping of local villages and damage to wildlife habitats.

Project progress
The project received a £9 million share of a £60 million government handout for its initiation.
Prince Charles House, designed by PRP Architects, an affordable housing eco-development of 31 flats for older people in St Austell was completed in April 2012
78 properties in Penwithick received energy efficiency and renewable energy measures.
Major improvements to the A391 were completed in June 2016, these include a new 1.6km section and two new bridges. Funding was received from the European Regional Development Fund.

See also

St Austell Clay Pits

References

External links
Cornwall Council Eco-communities
Eco-Bos
A Vision for our Former Mining Sites - Imerys page about the project

Eco-towns
Populated places in Cornwall
St Austell